The brown tit-babbler (Macronus striaticeps) is a species of bird in the family Timaliidae. It is endemic to the Philippines. 
Its natural habitats are subtropical or tropical moist lowland forest and subtropical or tropical moist montane forest.

References

Further reading

Collar, N. J. & Robson, C. 2007. Family Timaliidae (Babblers)  pp. 70 – 291 in; del Hoyo, J., Elliott, A. & Christie, D.A. eds. Handbook of the Birds of the World, Vol. 12. Picathartes to Tits and Chickadees. Lynx Edicions, Barcelona.

brown tit-babbler
Endemic birds of the Philippines
brown tit-babbler
Taxonomy articles created by Polbot